The Birmingham Thunderbolts were a short-lived springtime American football team based in Birmingham, Alabama. This team was part of the failed XFL begun by Vince McMahon of World Wrestling Entertainment and by NBC, a major television network in the United States.

Opening Season
The Thunderbolts played in the Eastern Division, with the Chicago Enforcers, Orlando Rage and the New York/New Jersey Hitmen. They finished the only year of XFL play – 2001 – in last place with the worst record in the league, at 2-8.

The Thunderbolts played their home games at Birmingham's legendary Legion Field. They were coached by Brooklyn-native Gerry DiNardo, a former star player at the University of Notre Dame, and previously head coach at Vanderbilt University and Louisiana State University. Following the collapse of the XFL, he went on to coach at Indiana University. One of DiNardo's assistants with the Thunderbolts was his predecessor at LSU, Curley Hallman.

The team's colors were purple, yellow, and white. Their logo was a stylized 'B' with six lightning bolts extending from it. On the teams helmets, the logo was placed at the front, instead of the customary position on each side, with only the upper three lightning bolts visible. The team was frequently referred to by fans and the media as simply the Bolts. Team merchandise almost always used the shortened Bolts moniker.

Allegedly, the league had originally planned to name the team the Blast; the XFL had named all of its teams with references to insanity and criminal activity, and the name "Birmingham Blast" likewise invoked images of the 1963 bombing of the 16th Street Baptist Church and of Eric Rudolph's 1998 bombing of a local abortion clinic, two tragic events in Birmingham history. As the league soon realized that such a name would have been in extremely poor taste, at the last minute the league changed it to "Thunderbolts," or "Bolts" for short. The team's logo is said to be the same one originally designed for the Blast. The Thunderbolts were unusual in that their nickname was benign.

While XFL players were encouraged to use nicknames instead of their last names on the backs of their jerseys, DiNardo banned Thunderbolts players from doing so.

After losing the opening game to the Memphis Maniax, the Thunderbolts posted wins over the Chicago Enforcers and the New York/New Jersey Hitmen. These would ultimately become the only victories the Thunderbolts would ever see. The Bolts would finish with a 2-8 record.

Birmingham went through all 3 quarterbacks during the season. Former Florida State quarterback Casey Weldon was signed as the starter. Former University of Alabama quarterback Jay Barker was signed as the backup, despite the crowds (averaging only 17,000 fans a game, second-lowest in the league) chanting his name during the home games. Barker would become the starter after Weldon injured his shoulder. Barker suffered a concussion in Chicago when he collided with Enforcers' cornerback Ray Austin while attempting a bootleg run on a broken play. He was replaced by third string QB Graham Leigh.

NBC dropped the XFL after the first (2001) season due to dismal ratings, and the league was disbanded shortly thereafter.

Season-by-season

|-
|2001 || 2 || 8 || 0 || 4th Eastern || --
|}

Schedule

Regular season

Personnel

Staff

Standings

Birmingham Thunderbolts players

80 Stepfret (Step) Williams WR college (LA-Monroe) played three seasons in the NFL seeing time with the Dallas Cowboys and the Cincinnati Bengals before joining the XFL
33 James Bostic RB college (Auburn)
71 Mike Edwards Offensive Guard (Nevada). Edwards also played for the Atlanta Falcons and the Washington Football team, before playing in the XFL.
81 Kaipo Mc Guire WR college (Brigham Young University) Mc Guire played in NFL Europe in the summer of 1999 with the Barcelona Dragons before splitting the 2000 season playing for the NFL's Indianapolis Colts and the CFL's Montreal Alouettes
89 Damon Gourdine WR college (San Diego State), son of singer Little Anthony of Little Anthony and the Imperials; played for the San Diego Chargers in 2000 before joining the XFL
32 Curtis "Cool Curt" Alexander RB college (Alabama) Alexander was on the Denver Broncos practice squad for the 1999 season before joining the Miami Dolphins for the 2000 season. Alexander joined the Buffalo Bills after the XFL folded; despite leading the team in rushing yards during the preseason, Alexander was a roster cut.
82 Quincy Jackson WR college (Alabama) Jackson played in the Arena Football League in 2000 with the Albany Firebirds before joining the XFL

Post-XFL developments
After the league folded, head coach Gerry DiNardo joined the staff of Birmingham sports talk radio station WJOX 690, as did Jay Barker, who also did sports commentary on local CBS TV affiliate WIAT channel 42. Barker currently hosts "The Opening Drive" on WJOX 94.5 in Birmingham with Tony Kurre and former NFL kicker Al Del Greco.

DiNardo returned to his college football coaching roots in 2002 as the head coach of the Indiana Hoosiers football team. The team was sometimes jokingly nicknamed "The Fighting DiNardos" in his honor. He was fired at the end of the 2004 season. He is currently a studio analyst for the Big Ten Network.

Team leaders
 Rushing yards: 539, James Bostic
 Receiving yards: 827, Stepfret Williams (also led league)
 Passing yards: 1238, Casey Weldon

References

 
XFL (2001) teams
2001 establishments in Alabama
2001 disestablishments in Alabama